The following highways are numbered 86:

International
 Asian Highway 86
 European route E86

Australia 

  - Federation Way, Honour Ave (New South Wales)

Canada
 Ontario Highway 86

Germany 
  Bundesautobahn 86 (unbuilt)
  Bundesstraße 86

Iran
 Road 86

Korea, South
Gukjido 86

New Zealand
  New Zealand State Highway 86

Poland 
  Expressway S86
  National road 86

United States
 Interstate 86 (Idaho)
 Interstate 86 (Connecticut-Massachusetts) (former)
 Interstate 86 (Pennsylvania–New York)
 U.S. Route 86 (canceled proposal)
 Alabama State Route 86
 Arizona State Route 86
 Arkansas Highway 86
 California State Route 86
 California State Route 86S (former)
 Colorado State Highway 86
 Georgia State Route 86
 Georgia State Route 86 (1930–1940) (former)
 Illinois Route 86 (former)
 Iowa Highway 86
 K-86 (Kansas highway)
 Kentucky Route 86
 Louisiana Highway 86
 Louisiana State Route 86 (former)
 Maine State Route 86
 Maryland Route 86
 Massachusetts Route 86 (former)
 M-86 (Michigan highway)
 Minnesota State Highway 86
 Missouri Route 86
 Montana Highway 86
 Nebraska Highway 86 (former)
 Nebraska Spur 86B
 New Hampshire Route 86 (former)
 New York State Route 86
 County Route 86 (Broome County, New York)
 County Route 86 (Cattaraugus County, New York)
 County Route 86 (Chautauqua County, New York)
 County Route 86 (Dutchess County, New York)
 County Route 86 (Montgomery County, New York)
 County Route 86 (Rockland County, New York)
 County Route 86 (Suffolk County, New York)
 North Carolina Highway 86
 Ohio State Route 86
 Oklahoma State Highway 86
 Oregon Route 86
 Pennsylvania Route 86
 South Carolina Highway 86
 Tennessee State Route 86
 Texas State Highway 86
 Texas State Highway Spur 86
 Farm to Market Road 86
 Utah State Route 86
 Virginia State Route 86
 West Virginia Route 86
 Wisconsin Highway 86

See also
List of highways numbered 86A
List of highways numbered 86S
A86

Other Uses 
Highway 86 is the name of an art installation by James Wines